Physical culture and sports football club Merw, also known as Merw Mary, is a Turkmen professional football club based in Mary. They play in the national top division; the Ýokary Liga. Their home stadium is Mary Stadium.

Historical names 
until 1966 – Lokomotiv 
1967 – Murgab 
1968–1989 – Garagum (Kara-Kum)
1990-until now – Merw

History 
In 1967–1969 and 1990–1991, the team played in the Soviet Second League.

The first big success of Merw FK after the collapse of the USSR came when they reached the final of the Turkmenistan Cup in 1993. In the final, they lost to Köpetdag Aşgabat with a score of 0:4. A year later, the team were the bronze prize-winner of the 1994 Ýokary Liga and took part in the preliminary round of the Asian Cup Winners' Cup 1994/95 season. The next 10 years were not marked by significant progress, but in 2004 Merw FK became one of the strongest football clubs in Turkmenistan. Merw FK claimed the bronze medal for the second time in the 2004 Ýokary Liga and, in 2005, they won the Cup of Turkmenistan. Their opponents in the Turkmenistan Cup final was Köpetdag Aşgabat (the game finished 1–1 after extra time and Merw FK won 3–1 on penalties). In 2006, the team, for the second time, entered the international arena by taking part in the 2006 AFC Cup and lost to the teams Dempo SC (2:2, 1:6) and Al-Nasr (0:2, 1:4).

Between 2007 and 2009, Merw FK played in the finals of the Turkmenistan Cup three times in a row. They lost to Şagadam FK in 2007 (0:1), won in 2008 by beating FC HTTU (2:1) and lost in 2009 to FC Altyn Asyr (0:3). In 2008, Merw FK won the Turkmenistan Super Cup by beating the champion of Turkmenistan FC Ashgabat. In 2009, for the third time in their history, Merw FK won the bronze medal in the 2009 Ýokary Liga. 

In 2012, the club became the silver prize-winner of the 2012 Ýokary Liga for the first time in history.

In the 2022 season, Magtymguly Begenjew as head coach led the team to the third place in Ýokary Liga, securing a AFC Cup spot for the Merw FK after a 16-years absence.

Honours

Domestic

 Ýokary Liga
 Runners-up: 2012
 Turkmenistan Cup: 2
 Winners: 2005, 2008
 Runners-up: 1993, 2007, 2009
 Turkmenistan Super Cup: 1
 Winners: 2008
 Runners-up: 2005

Performance in AFC competitions
AFC Cup: 1 appearance
2006: Group Stage

 Asian Cup Winners Cup: 1 appearance
1994–95: Preliminary Round

Managers
 Murad Bayramow (2005–06)
 Merdan Nursahatow (2006–2008)
 Magtymguly Begenjew (2008–2010)
 Rahim Kurbanmamedov (2011–2012)
 Rahmanguly Baýlyýew (2015–2018)
 Mekan Nasyrow (2019)
 Magtymguly Begenjew (2020–2021)
 Rahim Kurbanmamedov (2021–)
 Magtymguly Begenjew (2022–)

References

External links
football for the Peoples. Turkmenistan

Football clubs in Turkmenistan
1991 establishments in Turkmenistan
Mary Region